
The Allied Aviation Corporation was established in Cockeysville, Maryland, in January 1941 to manufacture laminated plywood components for aircraft. The firm also developed its own flying boat transport glider for the United States Navy, the LRA, which was built in small numbers for testing, but the larger LR2A was not proceeded with.

Allied Aviation acquired the rights to Gilbert Trimmers 'Trimcraft' small amphibious aircraft as the Trimmer. Production of prototype Trimmers was taken up by Commonwealth Aircraft Company as the Commonwealth C-170 Trimmer.

Following World War II, the company changed direction to focus on sailboat manufacture.

Aircraft

References

 
 

Cockeysville, Maryland
Defunct aircraft manufacturers of the United States
Defunct companies based in Maryland
Aviation in Maryland